El Salvador competed in the 2019 Pan American Games in Lima, Peru from July 26 to August 11, 2019.

On July 1, 2019, archer Roberto Hernández was named as the country's flag bearer during the opening ceremony. On the same day the El Salvador Olympic Committee announced the full team of 56 athletes (29 men and 27 women) competing in 21 sports. Later three athletes (one man and two women) were added to the team.

Competitors
The following is the list of number of competitors (per gender) participating at the games per sport/discipline.

Medalists
The following competitors from El Salvador won medals at the games. In the by discipline sections below, medalists' names are bolded.

|  style="text-align:left; width:78%; vertical-align:top;"|

|  style="text-align:left; width:22%; vertical-align:top;"|

Archery

At the first qualifier, El Salvador won two quota spots (one each in men's recurve compound). El Salvador would later qualify a woman in the recurve category in the final qualification tournament.

Artistic swimming

El Salvador qualified a duet of two athletes, marking the first time the country has competed in the sport since 2003.

Women

Athletics (track and field)

El Salvador qualified two male athletes.

Key
Note–Ranks given for track events are for the entire round
NH = No height
SB = Season's best 

Men
Track event

Field events

Badminton

El Salvador qualified a team of two badminton athletes (one per gender).

Basque pelota

El Salvador qualified one athlete in basque pelota.

Men

Beach volleyball

El Salvador qualified four beach volleyball athletes (two men and two women).

Bodybuilding

El Salvador qualified a full team of two bodybuilders (one male and one female). In the sport's debut at the Pan American Games, the country won both gold medals on offer.

No results were provided for the prejudging round, with only the top six advancing.

Bowling

El Salvador qualified a full team of two men and two women, for a total of four bowlers, by finishing among the top five at the PABCON Champion of Champions.

Boxing

El Salvador qualified two women boxers.

Women

Fencing

El Salvador qualified one female fencer in the foil discipline, after Puerto Rico declined its quota.

Women

Gymnastics

Artistic
El Salvador qualified one male and one female artistic gymnast.

Men

Women

Judo

El Salvador qualified one male judoka. Juan Diego Turcios qualified to compete in the 81 kg event, but did not make weight. Therefore he did not compete in the event.

Roller sports

El Salvador qualified two women in the speed discipline.

Speed
Women

Rowing

El Salvador qualified one female rower.

Women

Sailing

El Salvador qualified a spot in the men's laser event.

Men

Shooting

El Salvador qualified nine sport shooters (three men and six women). Later the country swapped one women's pistol quota for a men's pistol spot.

Men

Women

Mixed

Swimming

El Salvador qualified six swimmers (two men and four women), including three in the open water discipline.

Squash

El Salvador qualified a men's team of three athletes, marking its return to the sport at the Pan American Games for the first time since 2011.

Men
Singles and Doubles 

Team

Surfing

El Salvador qualified three surfers (one man and two women) in the sport's debut at the Pan American Games.

Tennis

El Salvador qualified three male tennis players.

Men

Triathlon

El Salvador received a wild card to enter one male triathlete.

Men

Weightlifting

El Salvador qualified three weightlifters (two men and one woman).

Wrestling

El Salvador received one wild card in the women's freestyle discipline.

Freestyle
Women

See also
El Salvador at the 2020 Summer Olympics

References

Nations at the 2019 Pan American Games
2019
2019 in Salvadoran sport